The Cedar Keys National Wildlife Refuge is part of the United States National Wildlife Refuge System, located near Cedar Key, at the western end of SR 24.   The  refuge was established in 1929.

External links

 Cedar Keys National Wildlife Refuge
 Review of Cedar Key National Wildlife Refuge

IUCN Category Ib
Protected areas of Levy County, Florida
National Wildlife Refuges in Florida
Protected areas established in 1929
1929 establishments in Florida
Cedar Key, Florida